Kadiam Mandal is one of the 19 mandals in East Godavari District of Andhra Pradesh. As per census 2011, there are 7 villages.

Demographics 
Kadiam Mandal has total population of 90,499 as per the Census 2011 out of which 45,066 are males while 45,433 are females and the Average Sex Ratio of Kadiam Mandal is 1,008. The total literacy rate of Kadiam Mandal is 68.58%. The male literacy rate is 63.77% and the female literacy rate is 59.21%.

Villages 

Damireddipalle
Dulla
Jegurupadu
Kadiam
Muramanda
Veeravaram
Vemagiri
Kadiapulanka
Pottilanka
Kadiyapusavaram

See also 
List of mandals in Andhra Pradesh

References 

Mandals in East Godavari district